Margaret Anne Cargill (September 24, 1920 – August 1, 2006) was an American philanthropist and heiress to part of the Cargill fortune.

Biography

Early life
Margaret Anne Cargill was born September 24, 1920, in Los Angeles, the daughter of Austen Cargill and granddaughter of W. W. Cargill. She grew up in the Midwest. She earned a degree in arts education from the University of Minnesota and moved to Southern California.

Philanthropy
She became one of eight heirs to the Minneapolis-based grain-trading conglomerate Cargill.  Forbes magazine listed her in 2005 as the 164th-richest American, with a net worth of $1.8 billion. She was a major donor to the American Red Cross, the Nature Conservancy, the Smithsonian Institution's National Museum of the American Indian and the American Swedish Institute. She gave away more than $200 million, always anonymously.

She established the Anne Ray Charitable Trust which provides grants for charitable and educational programs and scholarships.

She provided that, after her death, the Margaret A. Cargill Philanthropies would use her wealth for charitable purposes.

Death
She died from complications of chronic obstructive pulmonary disease on August 1, 2006, at her home in La Jolla, San Diego, California.

See also
James R. Cargill
List of billionaires (2004)

References

1920 births
2006 deaths
People from Los Angeles
People from La Jolla, San Diego
University of Minnesota College of Education and Human Development alumni
American billionaires
American women philanthropists
Philanthropists from Minnesota
20th-century American philanthropists
20th-century women philanthropists